Lake Holiday is an unincorporated community and census-designated place in Union Township, Montgomery County, in the U.S. state of Indiana. It is a private community on the banks of its eponymous body of water, notable for its dam, size, and its scenic beauty.

The community contains several parks as well as these subdivisions: Holiday Shores, Royal Hills, Imperial Woods, Wellington Villa, Cambridge Shores, Indian Hills, Sherwood Forest, and Seneca Hills.  With more than 360 houses and 1,365 lots, Lake Holiday is larger than several incorporated towns in Montgomery County.

Demographics

History
Many of the older houses in the community were built in the early 1960s, as was the dam that created Lake Holiday. In March 1993, the Montgomery County Circuit Court approved a district plan that reorganized the governance of the community into two major bodies: The Lake Holiday Conservancy District, which owns and is responsible for the lake, dam, boat ramps, parks, clubhouse, drainage, and maintenance building. The other governing organization, the Lake Holiday Property Owners Association, maintains the roads and is responsible for housing and lot developments. It is a tax-exempt entity.  

According to its website, the Lake Holiday area now "covers 750 acres, has 780 property owners, 369 homes, and 1,296 privately owned lots.  The lake itself covers 150 acres and has an average depth of 10 feet with depths up to 20 feet near the dam. There are many miles of shoreline along the lake and approximately 16 miles of roadway." 

The clubhouse hosts community breakfasts, regular card-playing events of a social nature, Easter Egg hunts, and other seasonal activities.   There is a crappie fishing tournament on the lake each May. In summer, bass fishing tournaments are held on Thursdays (weather permitting).

Location
Lake Holiday can be found five miles (8 km) southwest of Crawfordsville, off Indiana State Road 47, between County Roads 400 W & 550 S., near New Market.   
Its offices are located in the lake's clubhouse at 5000 South 400 West, Crawfordsville.

The lake, community, and its various subdivisions are all located in Union Township. It should not be confused with the campground of the same name.

Education
South Montgomery Community School Corporation operates public schools serving New Ross. Southmont Junior High School and Southmont High School serve secondary students.

References

 A source confirming the tax-exempt status of the governing organization: 

Unincorporated communities in Montgomery County, Indiana
Census-designated places in Indiana
Unincorporated communities in Indiana
Holiday
Bodies of water of Montgomery County, Indiana